The jackass shrew (Crocidura arispa) is a species of mammal belonging to the Soricidae family. It is endemic to Turkey. Its natural habitat is rocky areas.

References

Crocidura
Fauna of Turkey
Endemic fauna of Turkey
Mammals described in 1971